Darıca station is a station on the Marmaray commuter rail in Darıca, Turkey. It is a new station that has been added to the railway with the Marmaray project. Construction of the station started in 2013 and was structurally completed in 2014, along with the other eight stations located between Pendik and Gebze. Commuter rail service began on 13 March 2019.

The station has two tracks with an island platform and one express track on the south side for high-speed and intercity trains.

References

Railway stations in Kocaeli Province
Gebze
Railway stations opened in 2019
2019 establishments in Turkey